The Rainier III Nautical Stadium is a municipal sports complex on the Route de la Piscine in the La Condamine district of Monaco, in Port Hercules.

The swimming pool itself originally existed as sectioned off part of the harbour, dating back to at least 1949. However, construction was expanded in 1961, with the addition of a link road and expansion of facilities. The stadium consists of a heated saltwater Olympic-size swimming pool, with 1, 3, 5, and 10m diving platforms, and a 45m slide. The pool is converted into a 1,000m2 ice rink from December to March.

The pool gives its name to the "Swimming Pool chicane" (or "Piscine") at the annual Monaco Grand Prix.

Contrary to popular belief, the construction of the Nautical Stadium caused no changes to the layout of the Circuit de Monaco, as at the time, the original layout continued up a ramp, past the Tabac, on a road directly overlooking the swimming pool that is now grandstands and the pit lane.

In fact, the "swimming pool" section of the Monaco circuit was there not created specifically for racing as such, but merely used this link road (built in 1961) around the outside of the swimming pool. This happened in 1973 as it had been decided that a sectioned off pit lane was required for safety reasons and, having had to use temporary pits in 1972, the only place they had room to build permanent pits was by using what was then the current section of the circuit between Tabac and the Gazomètre hairpin. This forced the circuit onto the previously constructed link road around the outside of the swimming pool.

References

External links

1972 establishments in Monaco
Sports venues completed in 1972
Sports venues in Monaco
Swimming venues in Monaco